Un corazon herido is the seventh album by Mexican pop singer Yuri. It was released in 1987. She returns with the label EMI Music.It sold 250000 copies, earning a Platinum disc .

Track listing 

In 1986 Jimmy Osmond recorded his only one album in Spanish "Siempre tu" ("Forever you") produced by Jose Quintana and Stephen Tavani. Yuri was invited for himself to record the song "Dos en uno" ("Two in one") written by Rodolfo Castillo and KC Porter

Production
 Executive Producer: Miguel Blasco
 Art Director: Miguel Blasco
 Director: Gian Pietro Felisatti
 Musical arrangements: Gian Pietro Felisatti, Jesús Glück and Luis Carlos Esteban
 Recording Studio: MILAN-BABY ESTUDIO and MADRID-EUROSONIC
 Sound engineer: J. Alvarez Alija
 Additional engineer: Alberto Pinto
 Assistant: Antonio Alvarez
 Photography: Antonio Parra
 Graphic design: ZEN
 Stylist: Manuel

Singles
 "Es ella más que yo"
 "Mama Dame"
 "Un Corazón Herido"

Single Charts

1986 albums
Yuri (Mexican singer) albums